Scythris cucullella is a moth of the family Scythrididae. It was described by Bengt Å. Bengtsson in 2002. It is found in the United Arab Emirates, Oman and Yemen.

The wingspan is 7–10 mm. The forewings are dark fuscous with extended cream, diffuse markings. Most prominent are a dark oblique fascia at one-third and a dark costal spot at two-thirds. The hindwings are brownish grey.

Etymology
The species name refers to the hood-shaped uncus and is derived from Latin cullullus (meaning hood).

References

cucullella
Moths described in 2002